Diana Vladimirovna Goustilina (Diana Vladimirovna Gustilina; born 21 April 1974 in Vladivostok) is a Russian basketball player who competed for the Russian National Team at the 2004 Summer Olympics, winning the bronze medal.

References
FIBA Archives. 2003 European Championship for Women. Diana Goustilina Profile

1974 births
Living people
Sportspeople from Vladivostok
Russian women's basketball players
Basketball players at the 2004 Summer Olympics
Olympic bronze medalists for Russia
Olympic basketball players of Russia
Olympic medalists in basketball
Medalists at the 2004 Summer Olympics